Iraj Maani (born June 1985 in Ardabil, Iran) is an Iranian mountaineer. He started his climbing career when he was 15 years old. He has climbed his first Eight-thousander as a member of Iran's national mountaineering team. He is a member of the youth committee of the International Climbing and Mountaineering Federation.

Maani tried to make his first winter ascent of Nanga Parbat in 2014/2015 in a joint summit attempt between the Iranian team and the Spanish climber Alex Txikon. However, this attempt was not successful due to really bad weather conditions.

Iraj Maani established his second Adventure & Travel company in Iran. He is CEO of Irman Travel Group which has the responsibility both as citizens of Ardabil and as a cross-country tour operator to make Ardabil a better city for people to live in and a better city for tourists to visit. According to Responsible Tourism Policy, Irman Travel team actively works on sustainable development of tourism and looks after tourists, Iran's cultural heritage and the environment. Also, Irman Travel's excellent services will give a memorable and unforgettable experience to dear guests, tourists and mountaineers.

8000 m climbs

Other notable climbs

References

Iranian mountain climbers
1985 births
Living people